Tephrocactus bonnieae is a species of plant in the family Cactaceae. It is endemic to Argentina.  Its natural habitat is hot deserts. It is threatened by habitat loss.

References

bonnieae
Endangered plants
Endemic flora of Argentina
Taxonomy articles created by Polbot